Konny is a rural locality (a passing loop) in Samofalovskoye Rural Settlement, Gorodishchensky District, Volgograd Oblast, Russia. The population was 16 as of 2010.

Geography 
The village is located in steppe, 6 km north-west from Gorodishche.

References 

Rural localities in Gorodishchensky District, Volgograd Oblast